The Selig Monument is a public art work by artist Brian Maughan. It is located in front of the Miller Park stadium west of downtown Milwaukee, Wisconsin. The sculpture depicts Bud Selig, the former Commissioner of Baseball and former owner of the Milwaukee Brewers baseball team. It was dedicated on August 24, 2010.

References

2010 establishments in Wisconsin
2010 sculptures
Bronze sculptures in Wisconsin
Cultural depictions of American men
Cultural depictions of baseball players
Monuments and memorials in Wisconsin
Outdoor sculptures in Milwaukee
Sculptures of men in Wisconsin
Sculptures of sports
Statues in Wisconsin
Statues of sportspeople